Events in 1935 in animation.

Films released
 5 January - The Tortoise and the Hare (United States)
 7 January - Robinson Crusoe Isle (United States)
 9 January - Hey-Hey Fever (United States)
 11 January - The First Snow (United States)
 12 January - Buddy of the Legion (United States)
 18 January: 
Baby Be Good (United States)
The Gloom Chasers (United States)
 19 January:
Mickey's Man Friday (United States)
Mr. and Mrs. Is the Name (United States)
The Shoemaker and the Elves (United States)
 25 January:
Beware of Barnacle Bill (United States)
What A Night (United States)
 1 February: 
The Bird Man (United States)
 (United States)
 2 February - Little Black Sambo (United States)
 6 February - The Bull Fight (United States)
 9 February - Country Boy (United States)
 15 February - Taking the Blame (United States)
 16 February: 
Buddy's Theatre (United States)
 (United States)
 22 February:
Be Kind to "Aminals" (United States)
Fireman, Save My Child (United States)
 23 February - The Band Concert (United States)
 1 March: 
The Gold Getters (United States)
The Song of the Birds (United States)
 2 March:
I Haven't Got a Hat (United States)
The Bremen Town Musicians (United States)
 8 March:
The Lost Chick (United States)
The Moth and the Spider (United States)
 9 March - Buddy's Pony Express (United States)
 11 March - Two Little Lambs (United States)
 15 March:
Hotcha Melody (United States)
Stop That Noise (United States)
 16 March - Mickey's Service Station (United States)
 21 March - Old Dog Tray (United States)
 22 March:
Pleased to Meet Cha! (United States)
The Golden Touch (United States)
 25 March: 
Do a Good Deed (United States)
Make Believe Revue (United States)
 30 March:
Old Mother Hubbard (United States)
The Calico Dragon (United States)
 5 April - Flying Oil (United States)
 6 April:
Along Flirtation Walk (United States)
My Green Fedora (United States)
 12 April - Graduation Exercises (United States)
 13 April:
Good Little Monkeys (United States)
Mickey's Kangaroo (United States)
 19 April:
Peg Leg Pete, The Pirate (United States)
Swat the Fly (United States)
 20 April: 
Buddy in Africa (United States)
The Robber Kitten (United States)
 26 April:
The "Hyp-Nut-Tist" (United States)
The Peace Conference (United States)
 27 April:
Mary's Little Lamb (United States)
The Chinese Nightingale (United States)
 29 April - Elmer the Great Dane (United States)
 3 May - Modern Red Hood (United States)
 11 May:
Poor Little Me (United States)
Water Babies (United States)
 14 May - A Cat, a Mouse and a Bell (United States)
 17 May - Five Puplets (United States)
 18 May - Buddy's Lost World (United States)
 19 May - The Kids in the Shoe (United States)
 20 May - The King's Jester (United States)
 24 May:
No! No! A Thousand Times No!! (United States)
Scrappy's Ghost Story (United States)
 25 May:
Barnyard Babies (United States)
The Cookie Carnival (United States)
 31 May: 
Choose Your "Weppins" (United States)
Opera Night (United States)
 8 June - Into Your Dance (United States)
 14 June - King Looney XIV (United States)
 15 June - Summertime (United States)
 17 June -  (United States)
 21 June: 
A Little Soap and Water (United States)
The Puppet Murder Case (United States)
 22 June - Buddy's Bug Hunt (United States)
 26 June:
Little Rover (United States)
Who Killed Cock Robin? (United States)
 28 June:
For Better or Worser (United States)
Moans and Groans (United States)
 4 July:
’’ The Gummy Sour Kids Factory Year (1950) (United States)
 12 July:
Amateur Night (United States)
Dancing on the Moon (United States)
 13 July: 
Country Mouse (United States)
Mickey's Garden (United States)
 19 July - A Language All My Own (United States)
 20 July - Buddy Steps Out (United States)
 22 July - At Your Service (United States)
 26 July:
Dizzy Divers (United States)
Sinbad the Sailor (United States)
The Foxy-Fox (United States)
 28 July - Scrappy's Big Moment (United States)
 1 August - Garden Gaieties (United States)
 3 August - Mickey's Fire Brigade (United States)
 9 August - Chain Letters (United States)
 16 August - Betty Boop and Grampy (United States)
 17 August:
Neighbors (United States)
The Merry Old Soul (United States)
 19 August - Bronco Buster (United States)
 23 August - Birdland (United States)
 24 August - Buddy the Gee Man (United States)
 29 August - Scrappy's Trailer (United States)
 30 August - The Three Bears (United States)
 31 August:
Pluto's Judgement Day (United States)
You Gotta Be a Football Hero (United States)
 6 September: 
A Colour Box (United Kingdom)
Circus Days (United States)
Time for Love (United States)
 7 September -  (United States)
 14 September:
 (United States)
Monkey Love (United States)
 20 September:
Hey Diddle Diddle (United States)
Judge for a Day (United States)
 21 September - The Old Plantation (United States)
 23 September - Amateur Broadcast (United States)
 27 September:
A Happy Family (United States)
King of the Mardi Gras (United States)
 28 September - On Ice (United States)
 30 September - Balloon Land (United States)
 5 October - Music Land (United States)
 13 October - The Bon Bon Parade (United States)
 14 October - Foiled Again (United States)
 15 October - Football (United States)
 18 October - Making Stars (United States)
 19 October:
Hollywood Capers (United States)
Honeyland (United States)
Little Dutch Plate (United States)
 25 October - Adventures of Popeye (United States)
 26 October - Three Orphan Kittens (United States)
 28 October - The Quail Hunt (United States)
 1 November - A June Bride (United States) 
 2 November - Gold Diggers of '49 (United States)
 7 November - Let's Ring Doorbells (United States)
 8 November - Musical Memories (United States)
 15 November:
Aladdin's Lamp (United States)
Simple Simon (United States)
 16 November:
Alias St. Nick (United States)
Billboard Frolics (United States)
 18 November -  (United States)
 22 November - Henry, the Funniest Living American (United States)
 29 November - Southern Horse - Pitality (United States)
 30 November - Cock o' the Walk (United States)
 2 December - Case of the Lost Sheep (United States)
 7 December - The Spinach Overture (United States)
 13 December - Ye Olde Toy Shop (United States)
 14 December:
Broken Toys (United States)
 (United States)
Run, Sheep, Run! (United States)
 18 December - Little Nobody (United States)
 23 December - Doctor Oswald (United States)
 27 December:
Humpty Dumpty (United States)
Kannibal Kapers (United States)
The Mayflower (United States)

Events

January
 January 5: Wilfred Jackson's The Tortoise and the Hare, produced by Walt Disney Animation Studios, premieres.

February
 February 23: Wilfred Jackson's The Band Concert, produced by the Walt Disney Animation Studios, premieres. It stars Mickey Mouse performing an orchestra in the park, while Donald Duck and later a tornado cause mayhem. The short is the first Mickey Mouse cartoon animated entirely in color.
 February 27: 7th Academy Awards: Wilfred Jackson's The Tortoise and the Hare, produced by Walt Disney Animation Studios, wins the Academy Award for Best Animated Short Film.

March
 March 2: Friz Freleng's I Haven't Got a Hat, produced by Warner Bros. Cartoons premieres and marks the debuts of Porky Pig and Beans the Cat.
 March 16: Ben Sharpsteen's Mickey's Service Station, starring Mickey Mouse, Donald Duck, Peg-Leg Pete and Goofy, produced by Walt Disney Animation Studios, premieres.
 March 25: Alexander Ptushko's The New Gulliver premieres, a stop-motion adaptation of Gulliver's Travels.

May
 May 25: Ben Sharpsteen's The Cookie Carnival, produced by Walt Disney Animation Studios, premieres.

June
 June 26: David Hand's Who Killed Cock Robin?, produced by Walt Disney Animation Studios, premieres.

July
 July 13: Wilfred Jackson's Mickey's Garden, starring Mickey Mouse and Pluto, produced by Walt Disney Animation Studios, premieres.

August
 August 3: Ben Sharpsteen's Mickey's Fire Brigade, starring Mickey Mouse, Donald Duck and Goofy, produced by Walt Disney Animation Studios, premieres.
 August 10–September 1: 3rd Venice International Film Festival: The Disney cartoon The Band Concert, directed by Wilfred Jackson, is awarded a special Golden Medal and an award for Best Animation.
 August 16: Betty Boop and Grampy, directed and produced by the Fleischer Brothers, premieres. In this cartoon Betty Boop visits Grampy, who makes his debut.
 August 31: David Hand's Pluto's Judgement Day, starring Mickey Mouse and Pluto, produced by Walt Disney Animation Studios. Despite being an official Mickey Mouse cartoon, the plot revolves around Pluto, with him being tortured by hellish cats in a nightmare.

September
 September 6: Len Lye's experimental animated film A Colour Box premieres, produced by GPO Film Unit.
 September 14: Jack King's A Cartoonist's Nightmare, produced by Warner Bros. Cartoons, is first released. This self-reflexive animated cartoon features an animator being tormented by his creations in a nightmare.
 September 28: Ben Sharpsteen's On Ice, starring Mickey Mouse, Donald Duck and Goofy, produced by Walt Disney Animation Studios, premieres.
 September 30: Ub Iwerks' Balloon Land premieres. In this cartoon an evil pincushion man tries to kill anthropomorphic balloons.

October
 October 5: Wilfred Jackson's Music Land, produced by the Walt Disney Animation Studios, premieres. In this short the Land of Symphony and the Isle of Jazz fight a battle.
 October 26: David Hand's Three Orphan Kittens, produced by Walt Disney Animation Studios, premieres.

November
 November 2: Tex Avery's Gold Diggers of '49, produced by Warner Bros. Cartoons, premieres. It's Avery's directional debut for Warners. It marks the start of a wackier style of comedy at Warners' animation studio.
 November 16: Friz Freleng's Billboard Frolics, produced by Warner Bros. Cartoons, features the first use of the song Merrily We Roll Along which will later become their theme music.
 November 22: Betty Boop with Henry, the Funniest Living American, directed and produced by the Fleischer Brothers, features an animated adaptation of Carl Anderson's comic series Henry.
 November 30: Ben Sharpsteen's Cock o' the Walk, produced by Walt Disney Animation Studios, premieres.

December
 December 14: Ben Sharpsteen's Broken Toys, produced by Walt Disney Animation Studios, premieres.

Specific date unknown
 The Camel's Dance is released, directed by the Wan Brothers. It's the first sound cartoon produced in China.

Films released

 March 25 - The New Gulliver (Soviet Union)

Births

January
 January 1: Kenji Yoshida, Japanese anime producer, manga artist and illustrator (co-founder of Tatsunoko Production).
 January 7: Tommy Johnson, American orchestral tuba player (Walt Disney Animation Studios, All Dogs Go to Heaven, Tom and Jerry: The Movie, Toy Story, Toy Story 2, Antz, Ice Age, Looney Tunes: Back in Action, Mickey, Donald, Goofy: The Three Musketeers, The Ant Bully), (d. 2006).
 January 9: Bob Denver, American actor (voice of Gilligan in The New Adventures of Gilligan and Gilligan's Planet, himself in The Simpsons episode "Simpson Tide"), (d. 2005).
 January 22: Seymour Cassel, American actor (voice of Chuck Sirianni in the Justice League Unlimited episode "I Am Legion", Man in Panda Suit in the Gary the Rat episode "Manratten"), (d. 2019).
 January 27: Vladimir Zuykov, Russian animator and illustrator, (Film, Film, Film, Winnie-the-Pooh, About an Old Man, an Old Woman and Their Hen Ryaba), (d. 2021).

February
 February 16: 
Brian Bedford, English actor (voice of the title character in Robin Hood), (d. 2016).
 Sándor Reisenbüchler, Hungarian film director, animator and graphic artist, (d. 2004).
 February 18:
 Gennady Gladkov, Soviet and Russian composer (The Bremen Town Musicians).
 Vlasta Pospíšilová, Czech animator, screenwriter and director (Jiří Trnka Studio, Pat & Mat, Broučci, Fimfárum), (d. 2022).

April
 April 4: Kenneth Mars, American actor (voice of King Triton in The Little Mermaid franchise, Tuskernini in Darkwing Duck, Professor Screweyes in We're Back! A Dinosaur's Story, Grandpa Longneck in The Land Before Time franchise, Beethoven in the Animaniacs episode "Roll over Beethoven", Dr. Gunter Hunterhanker in the Freakazoid! episode "Candle Jack"), (d. 2011).
 April 9:
 Avery Schreiber, American actor and comedian (voice of Tubbs in Pound Puppies, Benny the Ball in Top Cat and the Beverly Hills Cats, Beanie the Brain-Dead Bison in Animaniacs), (d. 2002).
 Motomu Kiyokawa, Japanese voice actor (voice of Kozo Fuyutsuki in Neon Genesis Evangelion and Rebuild of Evangelion, Walter C. Dornez in Hellsing, Tem Ray in Mobile Suit Gundam, Tippy in Is the Order a Rabbit?, Artorius in Restaurant to Another World), (d. 2022).
 April 14: Barbara Frawley, Australian actress (voice of Dot in Dot and the Kangaroo and its sequels), (d. 2004).
 April 18: Jerry Dexter, American actor (voice of Chuck in Shazzan, Alan in Josie and the Pussycats, Ted in Goober and the Ghost Chasers, Aqualad in Aquaman, Sunfire in Spider-Man and His Amazing Friends), (d. 2013).
 April 29: Lennie Weinrib, American voice actor (original voice of Scrappy-Doo, King Leonidas and the secretary bird in Bedknobs and Broomsticks, Hunk in Voltron: Defender of the Universe, Bigmouth in The Smurfs), (d. 2006).

May
 May 2: Lance LeGault, American actor (voice of Junior the Buffalo in Home on the Range, Yank Justice in Bigfoot and the Muscle Machines, the Chief in Tugger: The Jeep 4x4 Who Wanted to Fly), (d. 2012).
 May 3: Ron Popeil, American inventor and marketing personality (voiced himself in the Futurama episode "A Big Piece of Garbage"), (d. 2021).
 May 8: Prescott Wright, American film distributor and animation producer (founder of the Ottawa International Animation Festival, produced the International Tournée of Animation, creative staffing specialist of Disney's Feature Division), (d. 2006).
 May 15: Burny Mattinson, American writer, director, and animator (Walt Disney Animation Studios), (d. 2023).
 May 18: Allan Burns, American television producer and writer (Jay Ward Productions), (d. 2021).
 May 28: Anne Reid, English actress (voice of Wendolene in A Close Shave).
 May 30: Lee Gunther, American film editor (co-founder of Marvel Productions), (d. 1998).

June
 June 9: Peter Renaday, American actor (voice of Splinter in Teenage Mutant Ninja Turtles, Sir George in Ben 10: Ultimate Alien, Abraham Lincoln in Animaniacs, Batman: The Brave and the Bold, and Evil Con Carne, Howard Stark in the Iron Man episode "Not Far from the Tree").
 June 12: Joe Mazzuca, American television producer (Filmation, Marvel Productions, Hanna-Barbera), (d. 2002).
 June 15: Doug Crane, American comics artist and animator (Terrytoons, Hanna-Barbera, Filmation, Spider-Man, Heavy Metal, Beavis and Butt-Head), (d. 2020).
 June 22: Floyd Norman, American comic book artist, animator (Walt Disney Animation Studios, Hanna-Barbera, It's Punky Brewster, Alvin and the Chipmunks, Cats Don't Dance), storyboard artist (Hanna-Barbera, DIC Entertainment, Garfield and Friends, Mother Goose and Grimm, Mickey's Once Upon a Christmas, Toy Story 2, The Tigger Movie, Monsters, Inc., Courage the Cowardly Dog, Disneytoon Studios, Click and Clack's As the Wrench Turns, The High Fructose Adventures of Annoying Orange, Free Birds, Robot Chicken) and writer (The Real Ghostbusters, The Hunchback of Notre Dame, Mulan).

July
 July 17: Donald Sutherland, Canadian actor (voice of Dr. Sid in Final Fantasy: The Spirits Within, President Stone in Astro Boy, the Narrator and Sir Percy Fitzpatrick in Jock the Hero Dog, Captain Charles Johnson in Pirate's Passage, Hollis Hurlbut in The Simpsons episode "Lisa the Iconoclast").
 July 19: Vasily Livanov, Soviet and Russian actor and animation director (Soyuzmultfilm).
 July 22: Stanley Ralph Ross, American writer (Wait Till Your Father Gets Home, G.I. Joe: A Real American Hero), and actor (voice of Gorilla Grodd and Brainiac in Super Friends), (d. 2000).
 July 29: Joan Gerber, American actress (voice of Granny in Corn on the Cop, Irma Boyle in Wait Till Your Father Gets Home, The Elephant in The Mouse and His Child, Mrs. Rich and Irona the Maid in Richie Rich, Mrs. Kelp in Snorks, Mrs. Beakley and Glittering Goldie in DuckTales, Gotcha Grabmore in Tiny Toon Adventures, Shreeka in the Teenage Mutant Ninja Turtles episode "Shreeka's Revenge"), (d. 2011).
 July 30: Nick Meglin, American comics writer, theater lyricist and animation scriptwriter (Batfink, The Pink Panther), (d. 2018).

August
 August 21: Yuri Entin, Russian and Soviet poet, playwright, and lyricist (The Bremen Town Musicians, Blue Puppy).

September
 September 14: Henry Gibson, American actor (voice of Wilbur in Charlotte's Web, Eleroo in The Wuzzles, Dr. Applecheek in Tom and Jerry: The Movie, Lord Pain in The Grim Adventures of Billy & Mandy), (d. 2009).
 September 16: Jules Bass, American director, producer, composer, lyricist and author (co-founder of Rankin/Bass), (d. 2022).
 September 18: Román Arámbula, Mexican comic book artist, animator (Hanna-Barbera), storyboard artist (Tubby the Tuba, TaleSpin, Little Shop, Attack of the Killer Tomatoes, Madeline, Warner Bros. Animation, Problem Child, 101 Dalmatians: The Series) and sheet timer (King of the Hill), (d. 2020).
 September 26:  Cullen Blaine, American animator (Hanna-Barbera, Alvin and the Chipmunks, Denver, the Last Dinosaur, The Simpsons, Garfield and Friends, Nine Dog Christmas), storyboard artist (Hanna-Barbera. Ruby-Spears Enterprises, Marvel Productions, DIC Entertainment, Ghostbusters, The Berenstain Bears, Spiral Zone, Garfield and Friends, Teenage Mutant Ninja Turtles, Calico Entertainment, Animaniacs, Timon & Pumbaa, Hey Arnold!, The Magic School Bus, God, the Devil and Bob, Grandma Got Run Over by a Reindeer, Globehunters: An Around the World in 80 Days Adventure, Make Way for Noddy, Barbie: Fairytopia, Arthur's Missing Pal, Higglytown Heroes), sheet timer (Warner Bros. Animation, DIC Entertainment, Jetlag Productions, Life with Louie, Happily Ever After: Fairy Tales for Every Child, Disney Television Animation, Jumanji, Toonsylvania, Silver Surfer, Dora the Explorer, All Grown Up!, Tutenstein, The Secret Saturdays, G.I. Joe: Renegades), writer (The Pink Panther Show), producer (The Get Along Gang) and director (Return to the Planet of the Apes, DIC Entertainment, Garfield and Friends, Hey Arnold!, Disney Television Animation, Kid Notorious), (d. 2020).

October
 October 1: Julie Andrews, English actress and singer (portrayed the title character in Mary Poppins, and voiced Princess Zeila in The Singing Princess, Queen Lillian in the Shrek franchise, Marlena in the Despicable Me franchise, narrator in Enchanted).
 October 20: Jerry Orbach, American actor (voice of Lumière in Beauty and the Beast), (d. 2004).
 October 29: Isao Takahata, Japanese animator, film director and producer (Grave of the Fireflies, The Tale of the Princess Kaguya), (d. 2018).
 October 31: Thomas Warkentin, American comics artist, comics writer and animator (Filmation, Warner Bros. Animation), (d. 2003).

November
 November 7: Lubomír Beneš, Czech animator and director (co-creator of Pat & Mat), (d. 1995).
 November 30: Woody Allen, American film director, writer, actor, and comedian (voice of Z Marion-4195 "Z" in Antz).

December
 December 11: Beverly Hope Atkinson, American actress (voice of Carol in Heavy Traffic), (d. 2001).
 December 30: Jack Riley, American actor (voice of Stu Pickles in Rugrats), (d. 2016).

Specific date unknown
 Fernando Krahn, Chilean artist, comics artist, illustrator and animator (El Crimen Perfecto), (d. 2010).

References

External links 
Animated works of the year, listed in the IMDb